My First Wedding is a 2011 Argentine comedy film directed by Ariel Winograd.

Cast
 Natalia Oreiro as Leonora Campos
 Daniel Hendler as Adrián Meier
 Imanol Arias as Miguel Ángel Bernardo
 Pepe Soriano as Lázaro
 Martín Piroyansky as Martín
 Muriel Santa Ana as Inés
 Gabriela Acher as Raquel
 Soledad Silveyra as Marta
 Gino Renni as Raúl
 Marcos Mundstock as Father Patricio
 Daniel Rabinovich as Rabbi Mendl

References

External links
 

2011 films
2011 comedy films
Films about weddings
2010s Spanish-language films
Argentine comedy films
2010s Argentine films